The Everyday Sexism Project is a website founded on 16 April 2012 by Laura Bates, a British feminist writer. The aim of the site is to document examples of sexism from around the world. Entries may be submitted directly to the site, or by email or tweet. The accounts of abuse are collated by a small group of volunteers. The launch of this website is considered to be the beginning of fourth-wave feminism.

History 
After graduating from Cambridge University with a degree in English Literature, Bates worked as a nanny and found that the young girls she looked after were already preoccupied with their body image. She set up the Everyday Sexism Project in April 2012 after finding it difficult to speak out about sexism.

Nearly a year after beginning the website, Bates reflected on the common response she had received. "Again and again, people told me sexism is no longer a problem – that women are equal now, more or less, and if you can’t take a joke or take a compliment, then you need to stop being so 'frigid' and get a sense of humor", she told Anna Klassen of The Daily Beast website in April 2013. "Even if I couldn’t solve the problem right away, I was determined that nobody should be able to tell us we couldn’t talk about it anymore."

At the time of the 2012 foundation of Everyday Sexism website, Bates had "hoped to gather 100 women's stories", but a year after the launch she wrote in The Guardian that it had grown very rapidly "as more and more women began to add their experiences – women of all ages and backgrounds, from all over the world", and was then "about to spread to 15 countries".

The Financial Times journalist Lucy Kellaway wrote about Bates and the project in the summer of 2014: "I have undergone an unsettling change of heart, and dumped almost all my beliefs on what it is to be a woman in Britain." The project affected Kellaway "in a way that the writings of Camille Paglia, Natasha Walter or Naomi Wolf never have. For the first time since the 1970s, I find myself cross on behalf of women, and rather inclined to take up cudgels. What has swayed me are not statistics or arguments but real stories of sexism. So far she has collected more than 60,000 of them, which sit there online, hard to ignore or dismiss." One feminist critic has been uncomplimentary. "Simply coughing up outrage into a blog will get us nowhere", wrote Germaine Greer in the New Statesman when she reviewed Bates' book Everyday Sexism in May 2014.

In April 2014, Bates was named as one of Britain's most influential women in the BBC Woman's Hour Power List 2014.

Campaign outcomes 
In January 2014, Everyday Sexism successfully campaigned for the removal of the mobile app Plastic Surgery & Plastic Doctor & Plastic Hospital Office for Barbie Version from the App Store and Google Play, for its promotion of a poor perspective on the concept of body image to those of a young age.

The Everyday Sexism Project has advised British Transport Police on the training of their officers to respond to complaints of unwanted sexual behaviour as part of Project Guardian, an initiative to increase reporting of sexual offences on public transport in London.

Bates told Brogan Driscoll of The Huffington Post in April 2015: "The entries have been used to work on policy with ministers and members of parliament in multiple countries, to start conversations about consent in schools and universities, to tackle sexual harassment in businesses and workplaces and to help police forces raise the reporting and detection rates on sexual offences."

Further reading

See also
 Everyday Lesbophobia, website about the negativity and discrimination faced by lesbians

References

External links

Everyday Sexism on Twitter
Women Under Siege

Feminist websites
Sexism
Fourth-wave feminism